The Memba are a people of Arunachal Pradesh. The Memba population is currently around four to five thousand. They mainly live in the districts of Shi Yomi, West Siang and Upper Siang.  Some also in nearby Tibet. The religious life of the Memba revolves around the Mechuka Gompa, similar to the Monpa of West Kameng and Tawang. Local genealogies suggested that they came from Tibet and settled in the region several centuries ago.

The Memba are agriculturalists and grow maize, millet, potato, cereals and paddy. Boiled rice and millet flour are staples in the Memba diet.

All Memba villages have their own watermills. Their homes, like most of the other Tibetan Buddhist tribes, are made of stone and wood. The house is raised above the ground and the floor and walls are made of wooden planks. Corrugated aluminum has replaced wood as a roofing material in recent years.

The Membas follow Nyingmapa Tibetan Buddhism and have their own script, Hikor, which is derived from the Tibetan script. In every village, there is a small Gompa presided by a Buddhist Lama. As devout Buddhists, they follow all the intricate details of rituals of Buddhist puja, hoisting at least a Buddhist prayer flag or a string of small Buddhist prayer flags in front of every household. Festivals that are celebrated by the Memba include Losar and Choskar.

References

External links 
 Asia Harvest ethnic profile
 Blackburn migration

Tribes of Arunachal Pradesh